L for Lester is a BBC sitcom first broadcast in 1982, starring Brian Murphy. The programme followed the misfortunes of a small town driving instructor.  It was intended as a new vehicle for Murphy after his previous hit show - George and Mildred - was retired following the sudden death of Yootha Joyce in 1980.

Premise
Lester Small is a driving instructor in a quiet West Country town with quite a reputation - for taking on clients that cause havoc and mayhem whenever they are on the road. His most consistent pupil is the hapless Mrs Davies, who usually drives into a perilous situation in each episode where Lester's car is usually either badly damaged or destroyed in the process (e.g. though a level crossing onto railway tracks, into a river, onto a firing range, and with a leaking petrol tank (on two occasions; the first time after Mrs Davies crashes into a barn, the second when a passing cyclist discards a cigarette).

None of these antics ingratiate Lester to either the local police chief (with whom he has a long standing feud), or with his bank manager - from whom he keeps having to borrow more money to repair or replace the damaged vehicles.  All this puts a strain on his long suffering wife (Amanda Barrie) and secretary (Linda Robson).

Reception

The series was a ratings failure and received mixed reviews from critics, and therefore was not renewed beyond its original run.

External links
 
 

1980s British sitcoms
1982 British television series debuts
1982 British television series endings
BBC television sitcoms
English-language television shows